"About a Quarter to Nine" is a popular song written by Al Dubin and Harry Warren and published in 1935 by M. Witmark & Son, New York.

Background
The songwriting partnership of Dubin and Warren wrote "About a Quarter to Nine" for the 1935 musical film Go into Your Dance, directed by Archie L. Mayo and starring Al Jolson and Ruby Keeler. In the film the song is introduced by Jolson. This song and the satirical song "She's a Latin from Manhattan" were the most successful songs from the movie.

The song was used again in the 1946 film of Jolson's life,  The Jolson Story. Jolson made a commercial recording of the song for the first time on June 18, 1947, for Decca Records.

Later cover versions
Among the musicians who successfully covered the song in the US in 1935 were Johnny Green and his Orchestra (with Jimmy Farrell on vocals), Columbia 3029), Victor Young and His Orchestra (vocal by Hal Burke), and Ozzie Nelson (1935, Brunswick). Later versions were recorded by J. Lawrence Cook, Wingy Manone, Claude Hopkins, and Ambassador Ambrose. A version by Bobby Darin was included in the CD Aces Back to Back (2004).

The Electric Prunes covered the song on their 1967 album The Electric Prunes.

In 1980 the song was used in the musical 42nd Street. In 1982 the song was covered by Peter Skellern on his album A String of Pearls, which made No. 67 in the UK Albums Chart.

In 2015 discographer Tom Lord listed a total of 21 cover versions, in the area of jazz, including Mavis Rivers / Nelson Riddle (1959), Red Norvo (1962, with Mavis Rivers and Ella Mae Morse), Rod Levitt (RCA, 1966), Susannah McCorkle (on The Music of Harry Warren, 1976) and Dave McKenna (Concord, 1981).

References

1935 songs
Songs with music by Harry Warren
Songs with lyrics by Al Dubin